Sangster is a surname of early medieval English origin. Notable people with the name include:

Charles Sangster (1822–1893), Canadian poet
Charles Thomas Brock Sangster, English motorcycle manufacturer 
Donald Sangster (1911–1967), former Jamaican Prime Minister
Donald F. Sangster, Canadian geologist
George Sangster, Dutch ornithologist
Jack Sangster (1896–1977), English motorcycle manufacturer
James Sangster (1796–1866), Canadian farmer and politician
James Alexander Sangster (1861–1937), Canadian merchant and politician
Jimmy Sangster  (1927–2011), Welsh screenwriter
John Sangster (1928–1995), Australian jazz musician
Margaret Elizabeth Sangster (1838–1912), American poet
Mike Sangster (1940–1985), English tennis player
Robert Sangster (1936–2004), English racehorse owner and breeder
Thomas Brodie-Sangster (born 1990), English actor
Will Sangster (born 1978), Australian rules footballer

See also
Sangster's, Jamaican liqueur
Robert Sangster Stakes, South African horseracing race
Sangster Elementary School, school located in the suburb of  Springfield, Virginia
Sir Donald Sangster International Airport, an international airport in Montego Bay, Jamaica

References